William Nathan Kay (born April 10, 1984) is an American actor and musician. He is best known for his portrayal of Shayne Lewis on the CBS soap opera Guiding Light.

Born on Long Island, New York, Kay began his acting career at a young age. At the age of eleven, he made his on-stage debut as Artful Dodger in the musical Oliver!, and went on to appear in various other theatrical plays including The Who's Tommy, The Sound of Music, and The Wiz. After appearing in several small film parts, Kay landed the role of Shayne Lewis on the CBS soap opera Guiding Light, which earned him a nomination for a YoungStar Award for Best Young Actor in a Daytime TV Series. He was also nominated for an Independent Spirit Award for Best Supporting Male for his performance in the independent drama L.I.E. (2001). Kay's other acting credits include films Halloween: Resurrection (2002), The Battle of Shaker Heights (2003), Debating Robert Lee (2004), and television series such as Touched by an Angel, CSI: Miami, and Charmed.

Filmography

The Magic of Marciano (2000)
Time Share (2000)
The Newcomers (2000)
L.I.E. (2001)
Halloween: Resurrection (2002)
The Gray in Between (2002)
The Battle of Shaker Heights (2003)
The Black Facade (2009)
Choose (2010)
Yelling to the Sky (2011)
Losers Take All (2011)

Awards and nominations

References

External links
 
 

1984 births
20th-century American male actors
21st-century American male actors
American male child actors
American male film actors
American male soap opera actors
American male television actors
Living people
Male actors from New York (state)
People from Long Island